The 1947 Swedish Ice Hockey Championship was the 25th season of the Swedish Ice Hockey Championship, the national championship of Sweden. AIK won the championship.

Tournament

Qualification 
 Åkers IF - IK Sleipner 3:8
 IFK Nyland - Hofors IK 5:6
 Wifsta-Östrand - IK Warpen 6:1
 BK Forward - UoIF Matteuspojkarna 4:13
 VIK Västerås HK - Nacka SK 6:3

Round of 16
 Mora IK - IK Sirius 9:1
 AIK - VIK Västerås HK 10:2
 Hofors IK - Wifsta/Östrands IF 2:3
 Södertälje SK - IFK Mariefred 10:2 
 Ljungby IF - Karlbergs BK 1:7
 Hammarby IF - UoIF Matteuspojkarna 4:3
 IK Sleipner - IK Göta 0:5
 Forshaga IF - Västerås SK 7:8

Quarterfinals
 Mora IK - AIK 2:6
 Wifsta/Östrands IF - Södertälje SK 1:6
 Karlbergs IF - Hammarby IF 4:6
 IK Göta - Västerås SK 9:4

Semifinals 
 AIK - Södertälje SK 3:2
 Hammarby IF - IK Göta 2:2/1:2

Final 
 AIK - IK Göta 3:2

External links
 Season on hockeyarchives.info

Cham
Swedish Ice Hockey Championship seasons